The 22140 / 39 Solapur–Mumbai CST Express is an Express train belonging to Indian Railways – Central Railway zone that runs between  & Mumbai CST in India.

It operates as train number 22140 from Solapur Junction to Mumbai CST and as train number 22139 in the reverse direction serving the state of Maharashtra.

Coaches

The 22140 / 39 Solapur–Mumbai CST Express has 1 AC First Class cum AC 2 tier, 2 AC 3 tier, 6 Sleeper Class, 4 General Unreserved & 2 SLR (Seating cum Luggage Rake) coaches. It does not carry a pantry car.

As is customary with most train services in India, coach composition may be amended at the discretion of Indian Railways depending on demand.

Service

Routeing

Traction

This train is hauled end to end by a Kalyan based WAP7 in its entire journey.

Timings

22140 Solapur–Mumbai CST Express leaves Solapur Junction every day except Wednesday at 21:10 hrs IST and reaches Mumbai CST at 05:10 hrs IST the next day.

22139 Mumbai CST–Solapur Express leaves Mumbai CST every day except Thursday at 21:20 hrs IST and reaches Solapur Junction at 05:30 hrs IST the next day.

See also 
 Siddheshwar Express

References 

 http://timesofindia.indiatimes.com/city/pune/Punes-rail-connectivity-goes-up/articleshow/20920955.cms
 http://www.ndtv.com/article/cities/rail-budget-2013-mumbai-commuters-to-get-ac-coaches-soon-335808
 http://dnasyndication.com/showarticlerss.aspx?nid=PDAJJAPsXBxZj4WoEyWkD1Em6li2iBrXJuRTLALz62w=

External links

Express trains in India
Transport in Solapur
Rail transport in Maharashtra
Transport in Mumbai